Hirshfield is a surname. Notable people with the surname include:

Al Hirschfeld (1903–2003), American caricaturist
Desmond Hirshfield, Baron Hirshfield (1913–1993), British accountant and life peer
James Hirshfield (1902–1993), Assistant Commandant of the U.S. Coast Guard
Jane Hirshfield (born 1953), American poet and writer
Jeff Hirshfield (born 1955), American jazz drummer
Leo Hirshfield (died 1922), inventor of the Tootsie Roll

See also
Hirschfield (surname)